Dackarna is a speedway club from Målilla in Sweden who compete in the Swedish Elitserien. Their home track is at the Skrotfrag Arena which was the venue for the Grand Prix of Scandinavia and is the current venue for the Speedway Grand Prix of Sweden. They ride in the Elitserien and are six times champions of Sweden.

History
The team was founded in May 1935 as Målilla Motorklubb and in 1949 renamed itself Dackarna (in honour of Nils Dacke) and the club began league racing. Dackarna raced in the highest level of league racing in Sweden between 1951 and 1965, winning the Swedish Speedway Team Championship in 1957, 1958, 1959, and 1962, and finished as runners-up in 1956 and 1964. Dackarna switched between the first and second league for the next 30 years until 1997 when the team received the backing of a major new sponsor (Svelux) and were renamed Team Svelux. Svelux were taken over by Luxo in 2002 and the team name was changed to Luxo Stars. In 2006 the sponsorship deal expired and the team name reverted to Dackarna. 

Success returned to Dackarna when they won the 2007 Elitserien after defeating Västervik in the play-off final. In 2021, Dackarna again became Swedish champions after defeating Smederna in Eskilstuna.

Smålänningarna and Team Dalej
Smålänningarna compete in the Allsvenskan and Team Dalej compete in the third tier (division 1), they are a collaboration between Dackarna and Lejonen allowing less senior riders the opportunity to race. The collaboration started in 2020 and the Smålänningarna name came from and old team that had riders from Småland.

Season summary

Teams

2023 Dackarna team

2023 Smålänningarna team
To be announced

Previous teams

2019 Team

 
 
 
 
 
 
 
 
 

2020 team

 
 
 
 
 
 
 
 
 

2021 Team (Champions)

 
 
 
 
 
 
 
 
 
 
 
 
 

2022 teams 
2022 Dackarna team
 
 
 
 
 
 
 
 
 
 
 
 
 
 
 
 

2022 Smålänningarna team
  Mathias Thörnblom 
  Casper Henriksson
  Sam Jensen 
  Wiktor Jasinski
  Aleks Lundquist 
  Jonas Knudsen 
  Daniel Kaczmarek
  Kacper Pludra
  Szymon Szlaunderbach
  Avon van Dyck 
  Tony Gudbrand
  Mika Meijer

References 

Swedish speedway teams
Sport in Kalmar County